This list of bridges in the Lithuania lists bridges of particular historical, scenic, architectural or engineering interest. Road and railway bridges, viaducts, aqueducts and footbridges are included.

Lithuania

Bridges
Bridges